Lewis Vulliamy (15 March 1791 – 4 January 1871) was an English architect descended from the Vulliamy family of clockmakers.

Life

Lewis Vulliamy was the son of the clockmaker Benjamin Vulliamy. He was born in Pall Mall, London on 15 March 1791, and  articled to Sir Robert Smirke.  He was admitted to the Royal Academy Schools in 1809, where he won the silver medal the year after for an architectural drawing, and the gold medal in 1813.  He was elected Royal Academy travelling student in 1818, after which he studied abroad for four years, mostly in Italy, but also visiting Greece and Asia Minor.

He was a great-uncle of the art potter Blanche Georgiana Vulliamy.

Vulliamy died at Clapham Common, on 4 January 1871.

Works

speculative housing in Tavistock Square and Gordon (later Endsleigh) Place in Bloomsbury (1827)
Neo-Gothic churches in the London area
St Bartholomew's, Sydenham (1826–31)
St Barnabas's, Addison Road, Kensington (1828–9)
St Michael's, Highgate (1830–32)
Christ Church, Woburn Square (1831–3, demolished)
St John the Divine, Richmond (1836)
St James' Church, Norlands (1844–45) 

Other churches:
St John the Baptist's Church, Smallbridge in Wardle, Greater Manchester
St John the Evangelist's Church, Worsthorne
Burnley (Holy Trinity, Accrington Lane)
Habergam Eaves
St Paul's, Burslem
Christ Church, Cobridge, in Staffordshire
Christ Church, Todmorden, Yorkshire
Glasbury church in Brecknockshire (1836–7)
the Italianate All Saints', Ennismore Gardens, Westminster (1848–9), now the Russian Orthodox Patriarchial Church of The Assumption of All Saints

St Peter's, Bethnal Green
St James the Less, Bethnal Green
St Thomas, Bethnal Green (damaged during WWII and demolished)
(Former) All Saints Church, Kensington (with Charles Harrison Townsend) restoration and additions (1887-1897) Now, Russian Orthodox Cathedral of the Dormition of the Mother of God and All Saints.
works at Rochester Cathedral (mid-1840s)
a grandstand at Wolverhampton racecourse (1828)
Epping union workhouse (1837)
the Lock Hospital, Paddington (1842–9)
the Law Society's premises in Chancery Lane (1828–32)
the re-fronting of the Royal Institution in Albemarle Street (1838), adding a giant Corinthian half-column screen
Syston Park

Friday Hill House, Friday Hill, London
Boothby Pagnell Hall (1825)
Dingestow Court, Dingestow, Monmouthshire (1845-6), addition of an Elizabethan style south front
Westonbirt House
Dorchester House, on Park Lane, London (demolished)
Various structures in Staunton Country Park
Dinder House Outer wings to this classic Regency House in Somerset.

The monument to Lord Edward Somerset at Hawkesbury Upton in 1843

Alderley House, a neo-Elizabethan manor house next to the church of St Kenelm in Alderley, Gloucestershire (formerly Rose Hill School until July 2009)

He drew the plans, elevations, and sections of the castle of Newcastle-upon-Tyne, published in Vetusta Monumenta,' 1835 (vol. v. plates x–xviii).

Published the book "Examples of Ornamental Sculpture in Architecture Drawn from the originals of Bronze, Marble, and Terra Cotta, In Greece, Asia Minor, and Italy - in the years 1818,1819, 1820 and part of 1821.- By Lewis Vulliamy Architect and engraved by Henry Moses." Size 470 x 330mm. 40 n0 folios.  (Digitised version, Unibibliothek Heidelberg). Includes fine engravings of architectural details from: The Choragic Monument of Lysicrates, Athens, Ornamental termination of the marble tiles at each corner of the Parthenon, capital from ruins of Temple of Apollo Didymeus, part of the soffit of Temple of Jupiter, part of frieze of Temple of the sun from the Gardens of the Colonna Palace in the Quirinal Hill at Rome and others.

See also
 List of ecclesiastical works by Lewis Vulliamy
 List of works by Lewis Vulliamy on large houses
 List of miscellaneous works by Lewis Vulliamy

References

Published by Lewis Vulliamy. 132, Regent Street; Henry Moses, 1 Portland Place, Wandsworth Road; Septimus Proett, 23 Old Bond Street; Robert Jennings, 2 Poultry; J.Taylor, Architectural Library, 59, Holborn and Priestley & Weale, 5 High Street, Bloomsbury.

External links
. 
Vulliamy on the RA site

1791 births
1871 deaths
19th-century English architects
British people of Swiss descent
Architects from London
Lewis